John Alphonsus Murphy (February 26, 1881 – November 29, 1935) was an American drummer serving in the United States Marine Corps during the Boxer Rebellion who received the Medal of Honor for bravery.

Biography
Murphy was born February 26, 1881, in New York City, New York and enlisted into the Marine Corps from Washington, D.C. January 5, 1897. After entering the Marine Corps he was sent to fight in the Chinese Boxer Rebellion. He received the Medal for his actions in Peking, China from July 21-August 17, 1900 and it was presented to him December 11, 1901. He died November 29, 1935

Medal of Honor citation
Rank and organization: Drummer, U.S. Marine Corps. Born: 26 February 1881, New York, N.Y. Accredited to: Washington, D.C. G.O. No.: 55, 19 July 1901.

Citation:

In the presence of the enemy during the action at Peking, China, 21 July to 17 August 1900, Murphy distinguished himself by meritorious conduct.

See also

List of Medal of Honor recipients
List of Medal of Honor recipients for the Boxer Rebellion

References

External links

1881 births
1935 deaths
United States Marine Corps Medal of Honor recipients
United States Marines
American military personnel of the Boxer Rebellion
Military personnel from New York City
Boxer Rebellion recipients of the Medal of Honor